Cabrini High School may refer to: 

 Cabrini High School (New Orleans), Louisiana  
 Cabrini High School (Michigan), in Allen Park
 Mother Cabrini High School, New York City